The Coppa Bernocchi is a European bicycle race held in Legnano, Italy. Since 2005, the race has been organised as a 1.1 event on the UCI Europe Tour.

In 1919 the business magnate Antonio Bernocchi founded the Coppa Bernocchi (or Bernocchi Cup), with his brothers Andrea and Michele Bernocchi in Legnano, and give the executive organization of the race to the family friend Pino Cozzi, President of the "Unione Sportiva Legnanese", sports club which has since organized the cycling race, which used the prestige of the Bernocchi brand license, already known all over the world, to publicize the race that will become one of the most prestigious in Europe. At the Bernocchi Cup have participated, and sometimes won all the greatest champions in the history of cycling, including Fausto Coppi, Pierino Bestetti, Michele Gismondi, Gino Bartali.

It is the last race of Trittico Lombardo, which includes three races held around the region of Lombardy in three consecutive days. These races are Tre Valli Varesine, Coppa Ugo Agostoni and Coppa Bernocchi.

Coppa Bernocchi is one of the most historic cycling races in Europe, with over a hundred years of history, and one of the most important in Italy.

Winners

Wins per country 

 103 races registered / although 102 races held only / 101 wins, (102 names because one doubled)
 1931 = Winner Alfredo Bovet (Italy), disqualified for not having signed in at one of the controls
 1953 = Double-Win (Albani / Bevilacqua)
 2020 = Winner Gorka Izagirre (Spain), Race: "Grande Trittico Lombardo", August 3, 2020

See also 
 Antonio Bernocchi
 UCI Continental Circuits

References

External links 
 Sitio oficial
 Coppa Bernocchi (sitiodeciclismo.net)
  La corsa su Cyclingbase.com
 La corsa su Cqranking.com
 La corsa su Cyclebase.nl
 La corsa su Sitodelciclismo.net
 La corsa su Museodelciclismo.it

UCI Europe Tour races
Cycle races in Italy
Recurring sporting events established in 1919
1919 establishments in Italy
Sport in Lombardy
Legnano
Classic cycle races